Francisco Carriedo y Peredo (November 7, 1690 – September 1743) was a Basque military officer, politician, and philanthropist. He was a general of the Santa Familia galleon and served as Capitán General of the Philippines.

In 1713, Carriedo was recorded to be the master of the Santo Cristo de Burgos galleon.

Carriedo is known for being the benefactor of Manila's pipe water system. As a retired Spanish Captain General in December 1733, he donated ten thousand pesos drawn from his fortune from the Acapulco-Manila investments. This donation was to the city and commercial interests of Manila and was for the establishment of waterworks for the benefit of the poor in the city. As nothing happened to this offer, he again bequeathed in a will dated July 27, 1743, the same amount and for the same purpose, with the stipulation that the fund was to be kept separate and devoted to the establishment, erection, and maintenance of waterworks. The fund was kept separate, accumulated interest, and was further enlarged by a special tax upon meat, devoted to that purpose. The will also specified that water should be given free to the San Juan de Dios Convent, gave funding to San Juan de Dios hospital, and gave free education of military officers. Carriedo did not live to see his resolve of creating a water system in Manila take fruit as the works were finally completed in 1878.

Today a museum stands on the grounds of Pinaglabanan Shrine in San Juan where the El Deposito, or the former reservoir was located, and commemorates Carriedo's contribution to the improvement of Manila's water and sewage system.

References

1690 births
1743 deaths
People from Santander, Spain
Captains General of the Philippines
Basque sailors
Spanish naval officers
Spanish philanthropists